Danaide has been borne by at least two ships of the Italian Navy and may refer to:

 , a  launched in 1942. 
 , a  launched in 1985 and sold in 2016 to Bangladesh for coastguard service. She was renamed CGS Kamruzzaman. 

Italian Navy ship names